Ryūō (also Ryu-O, Ryu-oh, Ryuuou; in Japanese 龍王, 竜王, lit. "Dragon King") is an annual Japanese professional shogi tournament and the title of its winner. The current Ryūō title holder is Sōta Fujii.

The Ryūō Tournament (Ryūō-sen 竜王戦) is sponsored by the Yomiuri Shimbun as well as the title awarded to its winner. It is one of the eight major professional shogi title matches and was first held in 1988. Among the eight titles in the professional shogi titleholder system, Ryūō and Meijin are the most prestigious ones. However, the Ryūō title gives out the highest monetary prizeeven more than the Meijin title. Cash prizes are ¥44,000,000 for the winner of championship and new Ryūō titleholder, and ¥16,500,000 for the loser. Additional compensation includes ¥14,500,000 for the previous titleholder and ¥7,000,000 for the challenger.

This title should not be confused with that of Amateur Ryūō which is awarded each year to the winner of the Amateur Ryūō Tournament.

Name 

The basic meaning of ryūō is a "promoted rook". It can move as both a rook (hisha 飛車) and a silver (ginshō 銀将) during a turn and is one of the two most powerful pieces in shogi.

Tournament structure 

The tournament consists of six class tournaments and one ladder-format challenger tournament. All currently active professional shogi players as well as qualifying women's professionals, apprentice professionals and amateurs are assigned to one of six classes. There are roughly 16 players each in Class 1 to Class 3, 32 players in Class 4 and Class 5, and then all remaining players are assigned to Class 6. The top players in these class tournaments (the top five players from Class 1, the top two from Class 2, and the top player from Class 3, Class 4, Class 5 and Class 6) are then seeded into the challenger tournament. The two players advancing to the final of the challenger tournament play a three-game match to determine the overall winner. In the title match, the first player to win four out of seven championship games becomes the new titleholder.

History 
The Ryūō is a continuation of the earlier Tenth Dan (十段戦 jū-dan sen) title tournament. The Tenth Dan (1962–1987) itself is a continuation of the Ninth Dan (九段戦, 1956–1961) and the earlier 全日本選手権戦 (1948–1955) tournaments, which were also sponsored by the same Yomiuri Shimbun. The 全日本選手権 tournament became a title tournament in 1950, where the title was known as the Ninth Dan (九段) title. (At this time, the highest dan rank in shogi was 8-dan unlike the current ranking system.) Considering this lineage, the Ryūō is second historical title and the longest running title tournament apart from the Meijin title.

Lifetime Ryūō 
"Lifetime Ryūō" (Eisei Ryūō) is the title awarded to a player who wins the championship five times in a row or seven times in total. Active players may qualify for this title, but it is only officially awarded upon their retirement or death.

Only two players have qualified for the Lifetime Ryūō title: Akira Watanabe and Yoshiharu Habu. Watanabe qualified for the title by winning his fifth championship in a row in 2008 (he has also won the title eleven times), whereas Habu qualified by winning his 7th title overall in 2017. Both players will be officially designated Lifetime Ryūō upon retirement or death.

Winners 
The number in parenthesis represents the cumulative times the player had won the title to date.

Records
 Most titles overall: Akira Watanabe, 11
 Most consecutive titles: Akira Watanabe, 9 in a row (2004–2012)
 Most times recapturing title: Yoshiharu Habu, 4
 Longest period between titles: Yoshiharu Habu, 15 years (2003–2017)
 Oldest person to win title: Yoshiharu Habu, 47 years and 2 months
 Youngest person to win title: Yoshiharu Habu, 19 years and 2 months.

Games played outside Japan
The first game of each of the following Ryūō title matches was played outside of Japan.

29th Ryūō challenger controversy
Hiroyuki Miura won the three-game challenger playoff match for the 29th Ryūō tournament by defeating Tadahisa Maruyama two games to one in early September 2016. Three days before Miura was to begin play against reigning Ryūō Akira Watanabe, however, the Japan Shogi Association (JSA) announced that Maruyama was replacing Miura as the challenger. The official reason given by the JSA had to do with Miura failing to follow proper procedure in requesting to be allowed to withdraw from the match, but there also had been suspicions raised about Miura's recent frequent leaving of his seat during official shogi games. Suspicions had been raised that he was doing so to consult shogi software or an app installed on a smartphone. Miura denied the accusations at a meeting of the JSA managing directors on October 11, and said he was withdrawing from the upcoming title match because he could not play shogi under such circumstances. The JSA said that Miura failed to submit an official notification of withdrawal by the required deadline on October 12 and as a result Miura was suspended from official game play until December 31, 2016.

The JSA subsequently established an independent investigative panel at the end of October 2016 to determine whether Miura had actually done anything wrong and to evaluate the appropriateness of its response to the allegations. The panel held a press conference on December 26, 2016 to announce its findings. The panel found there was insufficient evidence to support the accusations of cheating made against Miura and that the claim that he had excessively left his seat during official games was false. Regarding the action taken by the JSA, the panel stated that it believed that the JSA response was appropriate given the circumstances since it had no real option other than to act the way it did. In response to the panel's report, both the JSA and Miura held separate press conferences. JSA president Koji Tanigawa apologized to Miura and announced he was being allowed to return to active status in January. Tanigawa also stated that he and three other executives of the JSA would have their salaries cut by 30% for a period of three months. Miura criticized the JSA in his press conference and stated that "he wonders why the association banned him from participating in the Ryu-oh championship match since there was no evidence of wrongdoing" and that "he wants things to be settled as soon as possible and that he will try hard to get back to his winning ways".

On January 18, 2017, Tanigawa announced that he was resigning as JSA president to assume responsibility for the JSA's handing of the matter. The following day, the resignations of Tanigawa and Akira Shima, the director in charge of the JSA's handling of the Miura allegations, were accepted at an emergency meeting of the JSA's board of directors.

On February 27, 2017, another emergency meeting of JSA professionals was held in response to a petition signed by 28 current and former professionals asking that the JSA remove five board members involved in the handling of the controversy. The meeting took place via teleconferencing at JSA offices in Tokyo and Osaka, and a vote was held to determine whether the five should be asked to step down. Out of the 234 voting members of the JSA, 216 votes (including 64 by written proxy) were cast and a majority voted for the dismissal of three of the five: Teruichi Aono, Daisuke Nakagawa and Daisuke Katagami.

On May 24, 2017, Miura and new JSA president Yasumitsu Satō held a joint press conference to announce that a settlement had been reached to resolve any outstanding issues between the two sides. Both sides acknowledged their acceptance of the findings in the independent investigative panel's report and expressed their desire to move on from the matter. It was also announced that the JSA agreed to pay Miura an undisclosed financial settlement to compensate him for not only lost game fees, but also for the mental anguish and damage caused to his reputation. Miura also announced that he met with Ryūō title holder Watanabe prior to the press conference and that he accepted Watanabe's apology for his role in the controversy.

Players by Ryūō class 
Below is a list of professional players grouped by their class for the 36th Ryūō league (20222023) including their dan ranking. In addition to the regular professional players, current women's professional title holders Kana Satomi, Tomoka Nishiyama and Sae Itō as well as one other women's professional Momoko Katō, one apprentice professional 3-dan, and four qualifying amateur players also were assigned to Class 6. Women's professional ranks are denoted by a "W" and apprentice professional ranks are denoted by an "A" before a player's dan ranking.

Notes

References

External links
 Ryūō  Tournament: Japan Shogi Association 
 Ryūō Tournament website 

 
Shogi tournaments